Erwan Manac'h (born 2 October 1971) is a French former professional footballer who played as a defender.

Club career 
Manac'h played for 5 different clubs throughout his career: Brest, Monaco, Épinal, Toulouse, and Sochaux. He made a total of 61 appearances in the Division 1 in the process. In the 2000–01 season, he finished as Division 2 champion with Sochaux.

International career 
Manac'h represented France at youth level. He finished runner-up at the 1991 Toulon Tournament and was part of the squad that participated at the 1993 Mediterranean Games.

After football 
Later in his life, Manac'h went on to work in marketing for Adidas.

Honours 
Brest U19
 Coupe Gambardella: 1989–90

Sochaux
 Division 2: 2000–01

France U21
 Toulon Tournament runner-up: 1991
Individual
 UNFP Division 2 Team of the Year: 1997–98

References

External links 

1971 births
Living people
Sportspeople from Brest, France
French footballers
Footballers from Brittany
Association football defenders
Stade Brestois 29 players
AS Monaco FC players
SAS Épinal players
Toulouse FC players
FC Sochaux-Montbéliard players
Ligue 1 players
Ligue 2 players
France youth international footballers
France under-21 international footballers
Competitors at the 1993 Mediterranean Games
Mediterranean Games bronze medalists for France